Constituency NA-125 (Lahore-VIII) was a constituency for the National Assembly of Pakistan. After the 2018 delimitations, its areas have been divided among NA-131 (Lahore-IX), NA-132 (Lahore-X), and NA-134 (Lahore-XII).

Boundaries 
The constituency included DHA and Cantonment, the most affluent areas of Lahore. It also had a considerable population from adjoining villages on Badian Road.

After the 2018 delimitations, its areas have been divided among NA-131 (Walton Cantonment), NA-132 (Rural part around Bedian Road), and NA-134 (the vicinity of Church Road).

Election 2002 

General elections were held on 10 Oct 2002. Humayun Akhtar Khan of PML Q won by 22,405 votes.

Election 2008 

General elections were held on 18 Feb 2008. Khawaja Saad Rafique succeeded in the election with 70,752 votes and became the member of National Assembly.

Election 2013 

General elections were held on 11 May 2013. Khawaja Saad Rafique of PML-N won by 123,416 votes and became the  member of National Assembly.

Allegations of Rigging in Election 2013 
When the constituency was examined by the NADRA on December 14, 2014, they concluded that more than 20% of the votes could not be verified. The said votes were rejected for want of verification of thumbprint and CNIC numbers. The report alleged that in some instances, one person had cast multiple votes. A re-election was ordered by the election tribunal and the Election Commission of Pakistan notified Khawaja Saad Rafique. The decision was later turned down by Supreme court of Pakistan restoring winning candidate seat.

References 

Onlinelearns.com

External links 
 Election result's official website

Abolished National Assembly Constituencies of Pakistan